John McCutcheon (born August 14, 1952) is an American folk music singer-songwriter and multi-instrumentalist who has produced 41 albums since the 1970s. He is regarded as a master of the hammered dulcimer, and is also proficient on many other instruments including guitar, banjo, autoharp, mountain dulcimer, fiddle, and jaw harp. He has received six Grammy Award nominations.

Career 
McCutcheon was born to Roman Catholic parents in Wausau, Wisconsin. He attended Saint James Grade School, Newman Catholic High School, Saint John's University. 

While in his 20s, he travelled to Appalachia and learned from some of the legendary greats of traditional folk music, including Roscoe Holcomb and Tommy Hunter. His repertoire includes songs from contemporary writers like Si Kahn (e.g. "Gone Gonna Rise Again", "Rubber Blubber Whale") as well as a large body of his own music.

When McCutcheon became a father in the early 1980s he found most children's music "unmusical and condescending", and sought to change the situation by releasing a children's album, Howjadoo, in 1983. Originally, he had only intended to do one children's record, but the popularity of this first effort led to the production of seven additional children's albums. He has written three children's books. Much of his work, however, continues to focus on writing politically and socially conscious songs for adult audiences. One of his most successful songs, "Christmas in the Trenches" (from his 1984 album Winter Solstice), tells the story of the Christmas truce of 1914. 

In his performances, McCutcheon often introduces his music with a story.  He has become known as a storyteller, and has made multiple appearances at the National Storytelling Festival in Jonesborough, Tennessee.  He is married to children's author and storyteller, Carmen Agra Deedy.

McCutcheon's music has, since the 1990s, increasingly evolved into heartland rock-influenced ballads, while he still occasionally performs purer folk music. In 2011, he portrayed IWW organizer and songwriter Joe Hill in Si Kahn's one-man play Joe Hill's Last Will, produced by Main Stage West in Sebastopol, California.

Discography 
 How Can I Keep from Singing? (June Appal Recordings, 1975)
 The Wind That Shakes the Barley (June Appal Recordings and Rounder, 1977)*
 From Earth To Heaven (June Appal Recordings, 1978) (As part of group Wry Straw)
 Barefoot Boy with Boots On (Rounder, 1980)
 Fine Times at Our House (Rounder, 1982; reissued Greenhays, 2010)
 Howjadoo (Rounder, 1983)
 Winter Solstice (Rounder, 1984, with Trapezoid and Washington Bach Consort)
 Signs of the Times (Rounder, 1986, with Si Kahn)
 Step By Step: Hammer Dulcimer Duets, Trios and Quartets (Rounder, 1986)
 Gonna Rise Again (Rounder, 1987)
 Mail Myself to You (Rounder, 1988)
 Water from Another Time: A Retrospective (Rounder, 1989)
 What It's Like (Rounder, 1990)
 Live at Wolf Trap (Rounder, 1991)
 Family Garden (Rounder, 1993)
 Between the Eclipse (Rounder, 1995)
 Summersongs (series: John McCutcheon's Four Seasons) (Rounder, 1995)
 Wintersongs (series: John McCutcheon's Four Seasons) (Rounder, 1995)
 Nothing to Lose (Rounder, 1995)
 Sprout Wings and Fly (Rounder, 1997)
 Bigger Than Yourself (Rounder, 1997, co-written by Si Kahn)
 Doing Our Job (Rounder, 1997, with Tom Chapin)
 Autumnsongs (series: John McCutcheon's Four Seasons) (Rounder, 1998, family album)
 Springsongs (series: John McCutcheon's Four Seasons) (Rounder, 1999, family album)
 Storied Ground (Rounder, 1999)
 Supper's on the Table (Rounder, 2001, retrospective)
 The Greatest Story Never Told (Red House Records, 2002)
 Hail to the Chief (self-published, 2003)
 Hammer Dulcimer Repertoire (Homespun Tapes, 2003; CD and book)
 Stand Up! Broadsides for Our Time (self-published, 2004; reissue 2010)
 Welcome the Traveler Home: The Winfield Songs (self-published, 2004; reissue 2010)
 Mightier Than the Sword  (Appalsongs, 2005)
 This Fire (Appalsongs, 2007)
 The Hammer Dulcimer (Hal Leonard, 2007; 6 CDs and booklet)
 Sermon on the Mound (Appalsongs, 2008)
 Untold (Appalsongs, 2009)
 Passage (Appalsongs, 2010)
 This Land: Woody Guthrie's America (Appalsongs, 2011)
 22 Days (Appalsongs, 2013)
 Joe Hill's Last Will (Appalsongs, 2015)
 Trolling for Dreams (Appalsongs, 2017)
 Ghost Light (Appalsongs, 2018)
 To Everyone in All the World: A Celebration of Pete Seeger (Appalsongs, 2019)
 Cabin Fever: Songs from the Quarantine (Appalsongs, 2020)
 Bucket List (Appalsongs, 2021)

Books 
 Happy Adoption Day (1996)
 Christmas in the Trenches (2006, book with CD)
 Flowers for Sarajevo (2017)

Grammy Award Nominations 
John McCutcheon has received six Grammy nominations.
The Grammy Awards are awarded annually by the
National Academy of Recording Arts and Sciences.

|-
| align="center"|  || "John McCutcheon's Four Seasons: Summersongs" || Best Musical Album for Children || 
|-
| align="center"|  || "John McCutcheon's Four Seasons: Wintersongs" || Best Musical Album for Children || 
|-
| align="center"|  ||"Bigger Than Yourself" || Best Musical Album for Children || 
|-
| align="center"|  || "John McCutcheon's Four Seasons: Autumnsongs" || Best Musical Album for Children || 
|-
| align="center"|  || "John McCutcheon's Four Seasons: Springsongs" || Best Musical Album for Children || 
|-
| align="center"|  ||"Christmas in the Trenches" || Best Spoken Word Album for Children || 
|-

References

External links 
 John McCutcheon official site
 "Making waves making music – 2004 article in The Hook
 Audio/Video John McCutcheon is the only guest on Woodsongs show 471

1952 births
Living people
American folk singers
American fiddlers
American storytellers
American autoharp players
Converts to Quakerism
Hammered dulcimer players
American multi-instrumentalists
Fast Folk artists
Old-time musicians
Nonviolence advocates
American Quakers
People from Wausau, Wisconsin
Musicians from Charlottesville, Virginia
College of Saint Benedict and Saint John's University alumni
Appalachian dulcimer players
American male singer-songwriters
Singer-songwriters from Virginia
21st-century American violinists
21st-century American male musicians
Red House Records artists
Singer-songwriters from Wisconsin